Klawatti Lake is located in North Cascades National Park, in the U. S. state of Washington. Klawatti Lake is in a remote section of the park and well off any designated trails. Klawatti Lake was formed by the retreat of Klawatti Glacier and North Klawatti Glacier in the mid-1900s. During warmer months, melt from both the North Klawatti Glacier and Klawatti Glacier flows into Klawatti Lake.

References

Lakes of Washington (state)
North Cascades National Park
Lakes of Skagit County, Washington